Quick Quack Car Wash is a company that provides exterior car washes. The company is based in Roseville, California and has operations in Utah, Texas, Colorado, Arizona, and California with over 160 total locations. In 2008, Quick Quack Car Wash was listed on Inc. Magazine’s fastest growing companies.  According to Professional Carwashing & Detailing, an industry publication, Quick Quack Car Wash was the 4th largest car wash chain in the United States in 2021 with 160 locations.

Tim Wright currently serves as the President and Jason Johnson as the CEO of the company. Travis Kimball serves as the Chief Experience Officer.

History

Quick Quack Car Wash was founded in 2004 by Jason Johnson and his father-in-law, Clif Conrad, who operated a car wash in Utah. Johnson and Conrad formed a partnership with Tim Wright, Greg Drennan, Chris Vaterlaus and Travis Kimball. Conrad left the company in 2007.

The company initially operated under the name Splash & Dash Car Wash. In 2008, it purchased Amarillo, TX-based Quick Quack Car Wash and opted to operate all of its locations under that name.

Company

Quick Quack Car Wash provides exterior-only express car washes. It utilizes eco-friendly techniques in each of its locations. Using filtering technology, it reclaims 100% of the water used in each cleaning operation. In addition, the company utilizes biodegradable and non-toxic soaps and cleansers. Quick Quack Car Wash was the first car wash company in Sacramento to get certified as a sustainable business, and it was certified green by the Sacramento Business Environmental Resource Center.

Awards

In 2007, the company was named one of the "Top 50 Car Washes in the Country" by Modern Car Care magazine. In 2013, Quick Quack Car Wash was named the "Best Car Wash" by Sacramento Magazine. It also took the award in 2011 and 2012. Quick Quack Car Wash won the 2011, 2012, and 2013 award for "Best Car Wash" by the Amarillo Globe-News. In 2012, ColoradoSprings.com gave Quick Quack Car Wash the Gold award for its car wash services.

Quick Quack Car Wash was voted the best Car Wash in multiple regions. In Sacramento, CA region the company won "Best of Sacramento" in 2016, City Voters "A-List" in 2015, 2016 & 2017, The Press Tribune's "Best of the Best" in 2013, 2016 & 2017, Citrus Heights Chamber's "Best of Citrus Heights" in 2016 & 2017, Folsom Telegraph's "Best of the Best" in 2017 and the Sacramento County Business Environmental Resource Center recognized Quick Quack Car Wash for its water conservation efforts with a 2014 Sustainable Business of the Year Award. In Texas, the company was voted "Best of Lubbock" in 2015 and "Best of Amarillo" in 2014, 2015 & 2016. In Utah, the company was voted "Best of Utah Valley" in 2017. In Colorado, they were awarded the "Gold" award by the Colorado Springs Gazette in 2012 & 2013.

References

External links
 

American companies established in 2004
Retail companies established in 2004
2004 establishments in California
Companies based in Roseville, California